Jan Nowopacký or, in German, Johann Novopacky (15 November 1821, Nechanice – 3 August 1908, Slavětín) was a Czech landscape painter.

Biography 

He was born to a poor family of weavers. He showed creative talent at an early age, playing the flute and violin as well as painting, so his family sought a way to arrange a good education for him. They finally obtained the patronage of Countess von Harrach, who took him to Vienna to study with the portrait painter, Franz Schrotzberg.

After a few lessons, he attempted to gain admission to the Academy of Fine Arts, but was rejected because he did not speak German well enough. He went home to Nechanice, studied hard, reapplied, and was admitted in 1842. From there, he made several study trips to the Alps and Tyrolia. In 1848, he was a participant in the Revolutions and, fearing reprisals, returned to Prague when they failed.

Following his father's death, his financial situation became difficult and he accepted a job as a drawing teacher for the Paars, a notable family that was instrumental in establishing the Austro-Hungarian Postal Service. After two years, in 1851, he took a similar position with the Count of Hoyos in Lower Austria. His duties there involved travelling in Northern Italy and Campania.

He returned to Vienna in 1861, where he continued to be an art instructor for noble families. After 1869, he was engaged by the Imperial Family and taught painting to Crown Prince Rudolf. As a result, in 1880, he was appointed Custodian of the Imperial Galleries, a position he held until his retirement in 1895, when he returned to Bohemia to live with his niece in Ústí nad Orlicí.

He spent so many years in Vienna that he was generally considered to be an Austrian  painter. His first major exhibition in his homeland did not come until 1902.

References

Further reading
 Karel Jaroš (ed.), Jan Novopacký : obrazy, kresby (exhibition catalog) Municipal Museum of Ústí nad Orlicí (2000)

External links 

 Arcadja Auctions: More works by Nowopacký

1821 births
1908 deaths
People from Nechanice
Landscape painters
Academy of Fine Arts Vienna alumni
19th-century Czech painters
Czech male painters
19th-century Czech male artists